John Ainsworth may refer to:

John Ainsworth (by 1523-58/59), MP for Worcester
John Ainsworth (Wisconsin politician) (born 1940), American politician
Sir John Ainsworth, 1st Baronet (1844–1923), English industrialist, banker and Liberal politician
John C. Ainsworth (1822–1893), American pioneer businessman and steamboat owner in Oregon
Sir John Ainsworth, 3rd Baronet (1912–1981), see the Ainsworth baronets
John Ainsworth (actor), in films such as Forces' Sweetheart
John Ainsworth (film director), see British films of 1963
John Ainsworth (pilot), co-pilot of Jim Wallwork and one of the first Allied troops into France during the D-Day invasion
John Ainsworth (producer), writer, director, executive, and producer for Big Finish Productions
John Edgar Ainsworth (1920–2004), polymath and NASA physicist
John Dawson Ainsworth (1864–1946), British administrator in East Africa

See also
John Ainsworth-Davis (1895–1976), Welsh athlete and gold medalist at the 1920 Summer Olympics